SS Fatshan may refer to:

 
 

Ship names